Fog robotics can be defined as an architecture which consists of storage, networking functions, control with fog computing closer to robots.

Concept
Fog robotics mainly consists of a fog robot server and the cloud. It acts as a companion to cloud by shoving the data near to the user with the help of a local server. Moreover, these servers are adaptable, consists of processing power for computation, network capability, and secured by sharing the outcomes to other robots for advanced performance with the lowest possible latency.

As cloud robotics is facing issues such as bandwidth limitations, latency issues, quality of service, privacy and security - Fog robotics can be seen as a viable option for the future robotic systems. It is also considered as distributed robot systems of the next generation because robots require much brain power for processing billions of computations while performing its task. For instance, fog robotics can play an essential role in helping a robot to grasp spray bottle.

Applications

A social robot can either connect to the cloud or fog robot server depending upon the availability of information. For instance, it can make a robot working at an airport to communicate with other robots for effective communication with the help of fog robotics.

Fog Robotic Systems

Node-level systems: FogROS

FogROS is proposed by UCB. FogROS is a framework that allows existing ROS automation applications to gain access to additional computing resources from commercial cloud-based services. This framework is built on the Robot Operating System (ROS), the de facto standard for creating robot automation applications and components. With minimal porting effort, FogROS allows researchers to deploy components of their software to the cloud with high transparency.

Algorithm-level system: ElasticROS

ElasticROS is proposed by HKUST. The present node-level systems are not flexible enough to dynamically adapt to changing conditions. To address this, the authors present ElasticROS, which evolves the present node-level systems into an algorithm-level one. ElasticROS is based on ROS and ROS2. For fog and cloud robotics, it is the first robot operating system with algorithm-level collaborative computing. ElasticROS develops elastic collaborative computing to achieve adaptability to dynamic conditions. The collaborative computing algorithm is the core and challenge of ElasticROS. The authors abstract the problem and then propose an algorithm named ElasAction to address. It is a dynamic action decision algorithm based on online learning, which determines how robots and servers cooperate. The algorithm dynamically updates parameters to adapt to changes of conditions where the robot is currently in. It achieves elastically distributing of computing tasks to robots and servers according to configurations. In addition, the authors prove that the regret upper bound of the ElasAction is sublinear, which guarantees its convergence and thus enables ElasticROS to be stable in its elasticity.

Research

Fog Robotics
This project promotes the applicability of fog robotics with regards to human-robot interaction scenarios. It utilises fog robot servers, cloud, and the robots for evaluation of fog robotics architecture.

To improve the security and performance of robotic/machine-learning applications operating in edge computing environments, this project investigates the use of data capsules. As one of the applications, it also examines the fog robot system to preserve the privacy and security of the data.

This project particularly targets the field of radio access network at the edge. As part of this project, a real-time application of fog-assisted robotics is explored. Also, remote monitoring of robots and fleet formation for coordinated movement is being investigated.

This project focusses on designing novel programming models for Fog applications both hardware and operating system (OS) mechanisms including communication protocols of fog nodes. These fog nodes will be further tested real time on robots and other automation devices. Furthermore, an open-source architecture will be built on open standards, e.g., 5G, OPC Unified Architecture (UA), and Time-Sensitive Networking (TSN).

See also
 Cloud computing
 Cloud robotics
 Cloud storage
 Edge computing
 Fog computing

References 

Assistive technology
Cloud robotics
Internet of things